Executive Order 13988, officially titled Preventing and Combating Discrimination on the Basis of Gender Identity or Sexual Orientation, is the fourth executive order signed by U.S. President Joe Biden on January 20, 2021.

Provisions 
The order directs all federal agencies to review all policies which implement the non-discrimination protections on the basis of sex ordered by Title VII of the Civil Rights Act of 1964 (pursuant to the Supreme Court case Bostock v. Clayton County), Title IX of the Education Amendments of 1972, the Fair Housing Act and section 412 of the Immigration and Nationality Act of 1965 and to extend these protections to the categories of sexual orientation and gender identity. Extending beyond the scope of President Barack Obama's Executive Order 13672 of 2014, which protected against discrimination on the basis of gender identity in the civilian federal workforce as well as sexual orientation and gender identity discrimination by federal contractors, as well as President Bill Clinton's Executive Order 13087, which protected against discrimination on the basis of sexual orientation in the civilian federal workforce.

Effects

Reactions

Support 
The Human Rights Campaign hailed Biden's order as "most substantive, wide-ranging executive order concerning sexual orientation and gender identity ever issued by a United States president".

Opposition 
In opposition, Republican Senator Roger Marshall stated the executive order "shows no common sense and will bring about the destruction of women's sports". Former Ambassador to the United Nations Nikki Haley denounced Biden's order, calling it "an attack on women's rights".

Lauren Adams, legal director for the Women's Liberation Front said "both executive orders send a heartbreaking message to women and girls that their government does not view them as worthy of consideration and is not willing to recognize female people as a discrete class."

See also
 List of executive actions by Joe Biden
 LGBT rights in the United States
 Bostock v. Clayton County
 Equality Act, proposed legislation to formalize these and related changes into federal law

References

External links 

 US Presidential Actions
 Federal Register

2021 in American law
Executive orders of Joe Biden
January 2021 events in the United States
LGBT law in the United States
LGBT rights in the United States
Transgender law in the United States
Transgender rights